James H. Chrest (September 3, 1938 - August 26, 2015), was an American politician who was a member of the Oregon House of Representatives. He was a marine clerk.

References

1938 births
2015 deaths
Democratic Party members of the Oregon House of Representatives
People from Columbia County, Oregon
People from Burke County, North Dakota